Tears Run Rings is an American shoegaze band consisting of singer/bassist Laura Watling, singer/guitarist Matthew Bice, guitarist Ed Mazzucco, guitarist Tim Morris, and drummer Dwayne Palasek. They have released three albums.

History
Ed Mazzucco, Laura Watling, Tim Morris, and Dwayne Palasek have been collaborating various incarnations since the mid-90s. In 2007 they released their first EP as Tears Run Rings called "A Question and an Answer". They later teamed up with Matthew Bice of Shelflife Records to produce a full-length album entitled Always, Sometimes, Seldom, Never, which was released on Florida's Clairecords in April 2008. The album was well-reviewed (4/5 stars) and drew strong comparisons to shoegaze bands of 20 years earlier: "may be a dead ringer for Slowdive, right down to their torrents of cascading, distorted, and delayed guitars and ubiquitous male-female cooing, with slight seasonings of Moose, Chapterhouse, and Kitchens of Distinction".

Their second album entitled Distance was released in 2010. A third album was released in 2016, entitled In Surges. In December 2016, American webzine Somewherecold ranked In Surges No. 8 on their Somewherecold Awards 2016 list. In 2018, Tears Run Rings contributed an exclusive song to the Somewherecold Records Various Artists compilation Resistance: In Support of the Southern Poverty Law Center.

References

External links
 Tears Run Rings official website

Musical groups established in 2006
Dream pop musical groups
American shoegaze musical groups
Alternative rock groups from California
Alternative rock groups from Oregon
Somewherecold Records artists